The third season of the South Korean reality television competition show K-pop Star premiered on SBS on November 24, 2013, airing Sunday evenings at 4:55 pm KST as part of the Good Sunday lineup. Jun Hyun-moo replaced Yoon Do-hyun as host and narrator, and Yoo Hye-young replaced Boom as live host. Yang Hyun-suk and Park Jin-young returned as judges. BoA was replaced by You Hee-yeol, as she was focusing on her music career instead. Changes to the format occurred, including the choice of company for debut made immediately on the live finale. The season ended on April 13, 2014, with Bernard Park crowned as winner and choosing to sign with JYP Entertainment.

A special episode named, K-pop Star 3 D-1 Final Stage, aired on April 12, 2014 before the finals as a summary and analysis of the season.

Process 
Audition applications + Preliminary auditions (June - September 2013)
Preliminary auditions were held around the world in the United States, Australia, Hong Kong, Taiwan, and France.
First round: Talent Audition - Check for talents and skills (Airdate: November 24 - December 8, 2013)
Second round: Good, Fair, Poor Audition - Grading by judges into groups for audition (Airdate: December 15–29, 2013)
Third round: Team Mission - Contestants formed teams to compete (Airdate: December 29, 2013 - January 19, 2014)
Fourth round: Casting Audition - Being cast by one of three companies for a two-week training session (Airdate: January 19 - February 2, 2014)
Fifth round: Battle Audition - Competing for a spot in the Top 10 to advance to the live competition (Airdate: February 2–23, 2014)
Sixth round: Stage Audition - Judges decided and viewers voted during live competition to decide the final winner (Airdate: March 2 - April 13, 2014)

Judges 
Yang Hyun-suk: YG Entertainment CEO, producer, singer
Park Jin-young: JYP Entertainment Executive producer, producer, singer, songwriter
You Hee-yeol: Antenna Music Singer, songwriter, composer, pianist

Top 10 
 Bernard Park: Born 1993, from Atlanta, United States, Winner, debuted as soloist under JYP Entertainment
 Sam Kim: Born 1998, from Federal Way, United States, Runner-up, debuted as soloist under Antenna Music 
 Kwon Jin-ah: Born 1997, from Busan, eliminated April 6, 2014 (5th Live), debuted under Antenna Music 
 The Shorties: eliminated on March 30, 2014 (4th Live),
 Ryu Taekyung: Born 1995, from Daegu debuted under CS Entertainment  
 Yeo Inhye: Born 1995, from Daegu debuted under CS Entertainment
 Park Najin (Former): Born 1995, from Daegu 
 Almeng, eliminated March 23, 2014 (3rd Live), debuted as duo under YNB Entertainment, left in 2018 and signed with 2LSON Entertainment
 Lee Haeyong: Born 1990
 Choi Rin: Born 1990
 Han Heejun: Born 1989, from New York City, United States, eliminated March 23, 2014 (3rd Live), signed under Polaris Entertainment
 Jang Hannah: Born 1996, from Yangpyeong-gun, eliminated March 16, 2014 (2nd Live), signed under YG Entertainment, but left in 2017
 Bae Mina: Born 1999, eliminated March 16, 2014 (2nd Live)
 Something, eliminated March 9, 2014 (1st Live)
 Kim Ahyeon: Born 1992
Jeong Sewoon: Born 1997, from Busan, debuted as soloist under Starship Entertainment after competing in Produce 101 Season 2, finishing in the 12th place.
 Nam Youngju: Born 1991, from Seoul, eliminated March 9, 2014 (1st Live), debuted as soloist under JJ Holic Media

Round 6: Stage Auditions 
 For the Top 8 Finals, the Top 10 competed in two groups on stage with the results determined by the judges. The top three contestants from each group were chosen to proceed to the next round.
 The Top 8, who proceeded to the live stage, were determined by the three judges as well as a 100-member Audience Judging Panel. The last two contestants from each group became Elimination Candidates, with the Audience Judging Panel voting for their preferred act. The two acts with the most votes from the four Elimination Candidates proceeded to the Top 8, with the other two contestants eliminated.
 For the live Top 6 Finals, the Top 8 competed 1:1 on the live stage with the results determined by the judges. One contestant from each group was chosen to proceed to the next round.
 The contestants not chosen became Elimination Candidates and went through live TV viewers' voting by SMS and mobile messenger KakaoTalk, the top contestant proceeding to the next round.
 Of the remaining contestants, the judges chose to save one of them.

For the next three episodes (18-20), each week showcased a different company. As this season featured the winner choosing the company they wished to sign with on the final live stage, this gave the contestants the opportunity to experience and explore each company equally. The first week (Top 4 Finals) was YG Week, in which contestants received advice and help from YG. The second week (Top 3 Finals) was JYP Week. The third week (Semifinals) was Antenna Week.
For the Top 4, 3 Finals, Semifinals and Finals, the judges and viewers' scores were weighted 60:40, and were combined to eliminate the contestant with the lowest score.

Ratings 
In the ratings below, the highest rating for the show is in red, and the lowest rating for the show is in blue. (Note: Individual corner ratings do not include commercial time, which regular ratings include.)

References

External links 
  K-pop Star 3 Official Homepage
  

 
2010 South Korean television series debuts